TextbookStop is an online textbook company that offers students the option to either rent textbooks, buy textbooks, or sell textbooks. It was founded in Salt Lake City, Utah in 2008 by Pete Hurtubise and Brian Zilvitis, and is currently one of the primary textbook rental companies in the industry.

An increasing number of higher education students are choosing textbook rentals over more traditional textbook options. As students utilize tools on the Internet to compare textbook prices, many of them are choosing to rent or buy textbooks online rather than turning to their respective on-campus bookstores. Traditionally high textbook prices have been a major factor in the success of similar companies, with even the United States Department of Education investigating high textbook prices.

Business Model
TextbookStop offers its customers the option to either return their textbooks via mail (similar to a service like Netflix), or via one of TextbookStop's "drop-stops," a local business that accepts textbook returns. The postage for return shipping by mail is included in the rental price.

For students that elect to purchase their textbooks, TextbookStop offers the option of an online textbook buyback service. This online buyback service is similar to the online buyback offerings from other textbook websites. All online textbook buyback services traditionally buy textbooks at higher prices than their brick and mortar counterparts.

References

External links
Official Website
Bonpaper.com

Online retailers of the United States
Book selling websites